Frank-ly Speaking is an album by American jazz pianist Horace Parlan featuring performances recorded in the U.S. in 1977 and released on the Danish-based  SteepleChase label.

Reception
The Allmusic review by Ken Dryden awarded the album 4 stars, stating that "the playing is inspired throughout the date by everyone involved".

Track listing
 "Frank-ly Speaking" (Horace Parlan) - 3:55  
 "Quietude" (Thad Jones) - 4:28  
 "Hit It" (Lisle Atkinson) - 6:29  
 "Mirror Lake" (Idrees Sulieman) - 8:18  
 "Chocolate Cadillac" (Sulieman) - 10:04  
 "Misty Thursday" (Duke Jordan) - 6:39  
 "U.A.I." (Sulieman) - 7:22  
 "Veronica's Walk" (Tony Inzalaco) - 8:56

Personnel
Horace Parlan - piano 
Frank Strozier - alto saxophone
Frank Foster - tenor saxophone
Lisle Atkinson - bass
Al Harewood - drums

References

SteepleChase Records albums
Horace Parlan albums
1977 albums